Manav Hatya is a 1986 Hindi feature film starring Shekhar Suman, Madhuri Dixit, Sunil Thapa, Gulshan Grover, Sharat Saxena, Sriram Lagoo and Arvind Deshpande. The film was directed by Sudarshan Rattan and produced by Sarwan Singh Rehal. Manav Hatya didn't get a theatrical release and was ultimately shown on channels like Zee TV.

Cast

Shekhar Suman as Varun Shourie, Editor
Madhuri Dixit as Rama
Gulshan Grover
Arvind Deshpande as Ramkrishna
Sharat Saxena as Police Inspector Joseph
Rajesh Puri as Muthuswamy, assistant to Varun
Tom Alter
Sudhir Dalvi as Minister Baakelal
Praveen Kumar
Sunil Thapa as Police Constable Bajirao Kale
Sudha Chopra

Music
"Alap (Manav Hatya)" - Anuradha Paudwal
"Chaurahe Pe Khada Kabira" - Suresh Wadkar
"Pyar Mein Jitni Shartein Hain" - Anuradha Paudwal, Mohammed Aziz
"Simki Samoka" - Kavita Krishnamurthy, Malik Brothers

References

1986 films
1980s Hindi-language films
Films scored by Anu Malik